Boris Pelekh (Boris Peleh′; born Boris Fridrikhovich Pelekh, 17 November 1981) is a singer, composer, guitarist, most notable as the guitarist of the Gypsy punk band Gogol Bordello. He moved to New York City in 1991, at the age of 9, and joined Gogol Bordello in 2015. Aside from his work in Gogol Bordello, he also worked with the Nickelodeon duo Nat and Alex Wolff from 2008 - 2011.

Pelekh is the frontman, guitarist and primary songwriter of rock band Hey Guy.

References

External links
  Gogolbordello.com

1981 births
American male writers
American people of Romani descent
American people of Russian descent
American people of Ukrainian descent
Gogol Bordello members
Living people
Ukrainian people of Russian descent
Soviet emigrants to the United States